Real World/Road Rules Challenge: Battle of the Sexes 2 is the 9th season of the MTV reality game show The Challenge (at the time known as Real World/Road Rules Challenge). The season directly follows The Inferno.

Battle of the Sexes 2 is the first season of The Challenge to be a sequel from an earlier season, the show's sixth season, Battle of the Sexes. A casting special titled "He Says She Says: The Battle for the Battle of the Sexes 2" aired on September 27, 2004. Battle of the Sexes 2 premiered on October 4, 2004, and concluded on January 31, 2005. 

The season took place in Santa Fe, New Mexico. Before each challenge, each team would choose three leaders. If the team won, those three leaders would form the inner circle and decide whom to vote from their team; if the team lost, the rest of the team would form the inner circle and vote off one of their three leaders. No life-shields were used during this season.

Contestants

Game summary

 Women
 Men

Contestant Progress

Competition
 The contestant won the Final Challenge
 The contestant lost the Final Challenge
 The contestant was team leader and won the challenge
 The contestant was team leader, lost the challenge, but was not eliminated
 The contestant was safe from elimination
 The contestant was eliminated by the Inner Circle
 The contestant was disqualified from the competition due to physical violence

Final results
The three Guys remaining in the final challenge were Dan, Eric, and Theo
The three Girls remaining in the final challenge were Arissa, Coral, and Sophia
The Guys won the final challenge and won the $180,000 cash prize
Each team member received $60,000

Episodes

Reunion special
The reunion special, Battle of the Sexes 2: Reunion - Secrets from Elimination Hill, was aired on January 31, 2005, and was hosted by VJ La La Vazquez.

External links
The Real World/Road Rules Challenge: Battle of the Sexes 2 at the Internet Movie Database
MTV's official Real World website
MTV's official Road Rules website

Battle of the Sexes 2
2004 American television seasons
2005 American television seasons
Television shows set in New Mexico
Television shows filmed in New Mexico